Nicholas Lea (born Nicholas Christopher Herbert; June 22, 1962) is a Canadian actor known for his portrayal of Alex Krycek on The X-Files and of Tom Foss on Kyle XY.

Life and career
Lea was born in New Westminster, British Columbia. He attended Prince of Wales Secondary School (graduated 1980).

Lea's first major role was on the TV series The Commish where he played Officer Enrico Caruso from 1991 to 1994. It was during this time that he had a minor guest role in a first-season episode of The X-Files called "Gender Bender". The producers were impressed by his performance and when, in the second season, he auditioned for the role of turncoat FBI agent Alex Krycek, he was successful.

Lea guest starred in eleven episodes from 1994 to 1996 and became a popular character amongst the fans. Because of his character's willingness to switch sides, he was known as the 'ratboy'. In the season three episode "Apocrypha," Krycek was left to die in an abandoned missile silo with an alien ship. This allowed Lea to take a starring role in the series Once a Thief—which followed on from the 1996 John Woo film—alongside Ivan Sergei. The series was cancelled after one season. Lea continued to play Krycek, who became a nemesis not just of Mulder and Scully but particularly of A.D. Skinner (Mitch Pileggi).

Lea co-starred with Lau Ching-Wan, Theresa Lee and Bif Naked in the Hong Kong-Canadian film Lunch with Charles in 2001.

In 2006, Lea had a role on ABC Family's Kyle XY (26 episodes) playing Tom Foss, Kyle's tutor, and was one of the lead actors (playing Ethan McKaye) on the Canadian TV series Whistler. He was also that series' associate producer. He did not return to Whistler for its second season in 2007.

He has guest starred in shows such as NYPD Blue (3 episodes), Andromeda, Burn Notice, Sliders, Highlander: The Series, Judging Amy, CSI (4 episodes) (as Catherine Willows' boyfriend) and Men in Trees (10 episodes) (as Eric, the minister). Nicholas has also guest starred in the ABC remake of the sci-fi series V. He is also a member of the Board of Directors for the Lyric School of Acting in Vancouver.

Lea appeared in the film Guido Superstar: The Rise of Guido, starring, produced, and directed by Silvio Pollio, including Lea, John Cassini, Terry Chen, and Michael Eklund. The film screened at the 2010 Vancouver International Film Festival. In 2012 he portrayed Eliot Ness who formed the law enforcement group The Untouchables in the Supernatural episode "Time after Time". Lea had a minor role on Arrow as Mark Francis, who was Moira Queen's campaign manager. He appeared in three episodes.

Filmography

Film

Television

Video games
 Guido Superstar: The Rise of Guido (2010) (post-production) as Mr. Other Guy
 The X-Files: Resist or Serve (2004) (voice and likeness) as Alex Krycek

References

External links

1962 births
Living people
Male actors from British Columbia
Canadian male film actors
Canadian male television actors
Canadian male voice actors
People from New Westminster
Canadian people of English descent